Hani Al-Dhahi (born December 1, 1985) is a Saudi football player who plays for Mudhar as an attacking midfielder .

References

1985 births
Living people
People from Dammam
Saudi Arabian footballers
Al-Nahda Club (Saudi Arabia) players
Al-Fayha FC players
Hajer FC players
Abha Club players
Al-Taraji Club players
Mudhar Club players
Saudi First Division League players
Saudi Professional League players
Saudi Second Division players
Saudi Third Division players
Saudi Fourth Division players
Association football midfielders